I Love a Soldier is a 1944 American drama film directed by Mark Sandrich and written by Allan Scott. The film stars Paulette Goddard, Sonny Tufts, Beulah Bondi, Walter Sande, Mary Treen and Ann Doran. The film was released on August 15, 1944, by Paramount Pictures.

Plot

Cast 
Paulette Goddard as Evelyn Connors
Sonny Tufts as Dan Kilgore
Beulah Bondi as Etta Lane
Walter Sande as Sgt. Lionel 'Stiff' Banks
Mary Treen as Cecilia 'Cissy' Grant
Ann Doran as Jenny Butler
Marie McDonald as Gracie
James Bell as Williams
Barry Fitzgerald as Murphy

Reception
T.M.P. of The New York Times said, "To the wheel of life has been given a full, mad twirl in I Love a Soldier, which took up residence yesterday at the Paramount. And since life seldom moves along on a plane, maybe it would have been expecting too much for this particular film to maintain a perfect level. But the ups and downs and the fancy curves which the story takes in discussing the problem of war marriages neither makes for an arresting entertainment nor does it help to clarify a question that is of vital importance right now to a good many young people. Apparently both Mark Sandrich, the producer-director, and Allan Scott, the author, weren't quite sure either just how the subject should be treated, for they tackle it, by turns, in dead seriousness and with broad comic strokes."

References

External links 
 
Review of film at Variety

1944 films
American black-and-white films
1940s English-language films
Paramount Pictures films
American drama films
Films directed by Mark Sandrich
Films scored by Robert Emmett Dolan
1944 drama films
1940s American films